Marlton is an unincorporated area and census-designated place (CDP) in Prince George's County, Maryland, United States. The population was 9,802 at the 2020 census. The Marlton housing development, at first briefly called "Brandywine Country", grew up along U.S. Route 301 in the 1970s, and is part of the greater Upper Marlboro community. Originally made up of only single-family homes, more recently townhouses have been added.

Geography
Marlton is located at  (38.766568, −76.788922).

Demographics

2020 census

Note: the US Census treats Hispanic/Latino as an ethnic category. This table excludes Latinos from the racial categories and assigns them to a separate category. Hispanics/Latinos can be of any race.

2000 census
As of the census of 2000, there were 7,798 people, 2,830 households, and 2,153 families residing in the CDP. The racial makeup of the CDP was 39.24% White, 55.49% African American, 0.28% Native American, 1.56% Asian, 0.01% Pacific Islander, 0.82% from other races, and 2.59% from two or more races. Hispanic or Latino of any race were 2.42% of the population.

There were 2,830 households, out of which 41.5% had children under the age of 18 living with them, 54.7% were married couples living together, 17.2% had a female householder with no husband present, and 23.9% were non-families. 18.3% of all households were made up of individuals, and 2.6% had someone living alone who was 65 years of age or older. The average household size was 2.75 and the average family size was 3.12.

In the CDP, the population was spread out, with 28.6% under the age of 18, 6.9% from 18 to 24, 35.8% from 25 to 44, 22.8% from 45 to 64, and 5.9% who were 65 years of age or older. The median age was 34 years. For every 100 females, there were 92.2 males. For every 100 females age 18 and over, there were 84.8 males.

The median income for a household in the CDP was $73,844, and the median income for a family was $82,936. Males had a median income of $43,659 versus $39,928 for females. The per capita income for the CDP was $28,558. About 1.2% of families and 2.3% of the population were below the poverty line, including 2.3% of those under age 18 and 2.8% of those age 65 or over.

Government
Prince George's County Police Department District 5 Station in Clinton CDP serves the community.

Education
Marlton residents are assigned to schools in Prince George's County Public Schools.

Marlton and Mattaponi elementary schools serve sections of the CDP. James Madison Middle School and Gwynn Park Middle School serve sections of the CDP. Frederick Douglass High School serves all of the CDP.

References

Census-designated places in Prince George's County, Maryland
Census-designated places in Maryland
Washington metropolitan area